Tusker is a beer brand owned by East African Breweries, with over 700,000 hectolitres being sold in Kenya per year. It is also the largest African beer brand in the Diageo group. It is a 4.2% ABV pale lager. The beer's slogan "Bia yangu, Nchi yangu" means "My beer, My country" in Kiswahili.

History

In 1922, Kenya Breweries (now East African Breweries) was formally incorporated as a private limited company. The company's first beer was brewed on 15 December 1922. The first batch was delivered to the Stanley Hotel, where it was met with mixed reactions. The beer, originally from Kenya, shifted through to Tanzania and other countries in the African Great Lakes region, and soon began to be exported.

The company's first annual general meeting was held in 1923. George Hurst, the company's founder, was killed in an elephant hunting accident and in his memory, his brother Charles decided to name the first beer brewed "Tusker".

In 1929, the company's board moved to use malted barley in the beer's production instead of using imported malt extracts, significantly improving its taste and colour and saving the company at least £780 (approx. US$1,240 or €985) per year. In 2012, that is approximately £35,400 (approx. US$56,220 or €44,690), assuming an annual inflation rate of 2% from 2011 onwards.

Wooden beer cases were replaced with plastic cases in 1970. In 1987, Central Glass Industries also began producing Tusker bottles for the first time.

In early 2008, the UK supermarket chain Tesco began selling Tusker, followed soon after by Sainsbury's.

Varieties
Tusker, sold in keg, widget cans and bottles: 4.2% ABV pale lager
Tusker: 5.0% ABV premium lager
Tusker Lite: 4.0% ABV lite lager
Tusker Cider: 4.5% ABV Apple cider
Tusker Malt: 5.0% ABV Pilsner-Lager 

>
The three varieties of Tusker beer are a Gold award-winning products from the World Quality Selections, organized yearly by Monde Selection. The taste and quality have also received recognition at the prestigious Monde Selection’s International Awards.

References

External links

 Tusker Brand website
 Tusker at the East African Breweries website
 St. Killian is the Importer of Tusker to the United States

Diageo beer brands
Beer in Kenya
Kenyan brands